The Communauté de communes des Savanes (CCDS) is a communauté de communes, an intercommunal structure in the French département d'outre-mer of French Guiana. It was created in January 2011, and its seat is Sinnamary. Its area is 11,942 km2, and its population was 29,843 in 2018.

Composition 

The communauté de communes des Savanes comprises the following communes:

Administration 
The communauté de communes is led by an indirectly elected President along with a conseil communautaire composed of 11 Vice-Presidents and 23 conseillers communautaires.

President

Administrative seat 
The administrative seat of the Communauté de communes des Savanes is located in Kourou at 1 rue Raymond Cresson.

References 

Savanes
Intercommunalities of French Guiana